Eocarterus semenowi is a species of ground beetle in the genus Eocarterus.

References

S
Beetles described in 1893